Bacacheri Park is a park located in Curitiba, state of Paraná, Brazil

References

External links
Parque do Bacacheri (Curitiba) (in Portuguese)
Parque do Bacacheri / Parque General Iberê de Mattos (in Portuguese)

Parks in Curitiba